Jorge Luis Rivera (born February 28, 1972) is a retired American mixed martial artist who competed in the Middleweight division. Perhaps best known for his 15 fights in the UFC, he was also featured on The Ultimate Fighter 4, after competing for Cage Warriors and Cage Rage in England.

Background 
Rivera is from Boston, Massachusetts, then Milford, Massachusetts before finally settling down in Bellingham, Massachusetts. Being one of the ethnic minorities in these towns, the Rivera children often got into street fights. When he was 25 years old, Rivera began training in mixed martial arts.

Military career 
19k Tank with A/1-70 Armor at Fort Polk, Louisiana. He helped move the unit from Fort Polk to Fort Hood, Texas before his enlistment ended in 1992.

Mixed martial arts career 
Rivera's first sanctioned fight was in 2001, when he was 29 years old against Branden Lee Hinkle in Chester, West Virginia. Lee Hinkle, who had been fighting professionally for three years, also had the legendary Mark Coleman in his corner. Rivera landed a solid straight right hand early, that knocked out Lee Hinkle's mouthpiece and caused him to stumble, but then responded using his wrestling, picking up and slamming Rivera. Lee Hinkle then proceeded to land many punches that caused referee Din Thomas to stop the fight, making Lee Hinkle the winner by TKO.

Rivera's first fight in the UFC was a unanimous decision victory over David Loiseau at UFC 44. He then followed up with back-to-back submission losses to Lee Murray at UFC 46 and Rich Franklin at UFC 50 before rebounding with a unanimous decision win over Dennis Hallman at UFC 55.

Rivera was defeated by Chris Leben by technical knockout before appearing on The Ultimate Fighter 4 as a Middleweight contestant. Although Rivera was not successful in achieving a slot in the middleweight finals, he appeared on the live card of The Ultimate Fighter 4 Finale, defeating Edwin DeWees by technical knockout in the first round. Jorge then was defeated by Terry Martin by KO via an uppercut at UFC 67, fourteen seconds into round one. Jorge broke his jaw from the knockout punch and did not compete until UFC 80, where he knocked out heavy favorite Kendall Grove in the first round. He went 4–3 after the upset, with wins over Eric Schafer, Nate Quarry, Nissen Osterneck and submission artist Rob Kimmons, with his only losses since coming from top level opponents Martin Kampmann, Michael Bisping, and Costas Philippou.

Rivera was scheduled to face Alessio Sakara on August 28, 2010 at UFC 118, but was forced off the card with an arm injury and replaced by Gerald Harris.

Rivera/Sakara was expected to take place on November 13, 2010 at UFC 122. The fight was scrapped the day of the fight due to a "flu-like" illness from Sakara.

On February 27, 2011 at UFC 127 Rivera lost to Michael Bisping by way of TKO at 1:54 in the 2nd round. Weeks before he was set to fight Bisping, Rivera made some videos mocking and insulting Bisping and his family.

The bout between Rivera and Sakara had been rescheduled again for August 6, 2011 at UFC 133. Before Rivera's fight against Sakara, Rivera mentioned that he may retire from the sport after his next fight due to his age. Rivera instead faced Costas Philippou. He lost the fight via split decision.

Rivera faced Eric Schafer on January 20, 2012 at UFC on FX 1. After a dominant first round from Schafer due to takedowns and ground control, Rivera turned the fight around in the second round and won by TKO due to punches.

Following the fight, Rivera retired from mixed martial arts competition.

Personal life 
Rivera has five children, a son and four daughters, Janessa, Elijah, Marianna, Johanna, and Alanna Rivera. On August 5, 2008, his oldest daughter Janessa Marie died unexpectedly from a reaction to prescription medication.

Mixed martial arts record 

|-
| Win
| align=center| 20–9
| Eric Schafer
| TKO (punches)
| UFC on FX: Guillard vs. Miller
| 
| align=center| 2
| align=center| 1:31
| Nashville, Tennessee, United States
| 
|-
| Loss
| align=center| 19–9
| Costas Philippou
| Decision (split)
| UFC 133
| 
| align=center| 3
| align=center| 5:00
| Philadelphia, Pennsylvania, United States
| 
|-
| Loss
| align=center| 19–8
| Michael Bisping
| TKO (punches)
| UFC 127
| 
| align=center| 2
| align=center| 1:54
| Sydney, Australia
| 
|-
| Win
| align=center| 19–7
| Nate Quarry
| TKO (punches)
| UFC Fight Night: Florian vs. Gomi
| 
| align=center| 2
| align=center| 0:29
| Charlotte, North Carolina, United States
| 
|-
| Win
| align=center| 18–7
| Rob Kimmons
| TKO (punches)
| UFC 104
| 
| align=center| 3
| align=center| 1:53
| Los Angeles, California, United States
| 
|-
| Win
| align=center| 17–7
| Nissen Osterneck
| Decision (split)
| UFC Fight Night: Condit vs. Kampmann
| 
| align=center| 3
| align=center| 5:00
| Nashville, Tennessee, United States
| 
|-
| Loss
| align=center| 16–7
| Martin Kampmann
| Submission (guillotine choke)
| UFC 85
| 
| align=center| 1
| align=center| 2:44
| London, England
| 
|-
| Win
| align=center| 16–6
| Kendall Grove
| KO (punches)
| UFC 80
| 
| align=center| 1
| align=center| 1:20
| Newcastle, England
| 
|-
| Loss
| align=center| 15–6
| Terry Martin
| KO (punches)
| UFC 67
| 
| align=center| 1
| align=center| 0:14
| Las Vegas, Nevada, United States
| 
|-
| Win
| align=center| 15–5
| Edwin Dewees
| TKO (punches)
| The Ultimate Fighter: The Comeback Finale
| 
| align=center| 1
| align=center| 2:37
| Las Vegas, Nevada, United States
| 
|-
| Win
| align=center| 14–5
| Timothy Williams
| TKO (punches)
| WFL – Real: No Fooling Around
| 
| align=center| 1
| align=center| 3:50
| Revere, Massachusetts, United States
| 
|-
| Loss
| align=center| 13–5
| Chris Leben
| TKO (punches)
| UFC Fight Night 3
| 
| align=center| 1
| align=center| 1:44
| Las Vegas, Nevada, United States
| 
|-
| Win
| align=center| 13–4
| Dennis Hallman
| Decision (unanimous)
| UFC 55: Fury
| 
| align=center| 3
| align=center| 5:00
| Uncasville, Connecticut, United States
| 
|-
| Win
| align=center| 12–4
| Marcelo Azevedo
| Decision (unanimous)
| Cage Rage 13
| 
| align=center| 3
| align=center| 5:00
| London, England
| 
|-
| Win
| align=center| 11–4
| Danny Vega
| Technical submission (arm-triangle choke)
| WFL: Unleashed
| 
| align=center| 1
| align=center| 0:47
| Revere, Massachusetts, United States
| 
|-
| Loss
| align=center| 10–4
| Anderson Silva
| TKO (knees and punches)
| Cage Rage 11
| 
| align=center| 2
| align=center| 3:53
| London, England
| 
|-
| Win
| align=center| 10–3
| Alex Reid
| KO (punches)
| Cage Rage 10
| 
| align=center| 1
| align=center| 0:41
| London, England
| 
|-
| Loss
| align=center| 9–3
| Rich Franklin
| Submission (armbar)
| UFC 50
| 
| align=center| 3
| align=center| 4:28
| Atlantic City, New Jersey, United States
| 
|-
| Win
| align=center| 9–2
| Mark Weir
| TKO (doctor stoppage)
| Cage Rage 7
| 
| align=center| 1
| align=center| 5:00
| London, England
| 
|-
| Win
| align=center| 8–2
| James Gabert
| TKO (punches)
| MMA: Eruption
| 
| align=center| 3
| align=center| 4:10
| Lowell, Massachusetts, United States
| 
|-
| Loss
| align=center| 7–2
| Lee Murray
| Submission (triangle armbar)
| UFC 46
| 
| align=center| 1
| align=center| 1:45
| Las Vegas, Nevada, United States
| 
|-
| Win
| align=center| 7–1
| David Loiseau
| Decision (unanimous)
| UFC 44
| 
| align=center| 3
| align=center| 5:00
| Las Vegas, Nevada, United States
|
|-
| Win
| align=center| 6–1
| Solomon Hutcherson
| KO (punches)
| USMMA 3: Ring of Fury
| 
| align=center| 1
| align=center| 3:01
| Boston, Massachusetts, United States
| 
|-
| Win
| align=center| 5–1
| Andy Lagden
| Submission (rear naked choke)
| CWFC 2 - Fists of Fury
| 
| align=center| 1
| align=center| N/A
| London, England
| 
|-
| Win
| align=center| 4–1
| Travis Lutter
| TKO (punches)
| USMMA 2: Ring of Fury
| 
| align=center| 3
| align=center| 3:46
| Lowell, Massachusetts, United States
|
|-
| Win
| align=center| 3–1
| Joe Nye
| TKO (punches)
| USMMA 1: Ring of Fury
| 
| align=center| 1
| align=center| 0:52
| Lowell, Massachusetts, United States
|
|-
| Win
| align=center| 2–1
| Brian Hawkins
| KO (punches)
| TFC FightZone: Back in the Zone
| 
| align=center| 1
| align=center| N/A
| Toledo, Ohio, United States
| 
|-
| Win
| align=center| 1–1
| Elias Rivera
| TKO (punches)
| Mass Destruction 3
| 
| align=center| 1
| align=center| 6:50
| Springfield, Massachusetts, United States
|
|-
| Loss
| align=center| 0–1
| Branden Lee Hinkle
| TKO (corner stoppage)
| RSF 2: Attack at the Track
| 
| align=center| 2
| align=center| 1:54
| Chester, West Virginia, United States
|

See also 

 List of Puerto Ricans

References

External links 
 
 

Living people
1972 births
American male mixed martial artists
Middleweight mixed martial artists
Mixed martial artists utilizing Brazilian jiu-jitsu
Mixed martial artists from Massachusetts
American practitioners of Brazilian jiu-jitsu
American people of Puerto Rican descent
People awarded a black belt in Brazilian jiu-jitsu
Puerto Rican Army personnel
Ultimate Fighting Championship male fighters